Utgard may refer to:

 Útgarðar, a stronghold of the giants
 Utgard (software), a vendor-independent Java OPC client API
 The microarchitecture of some variants of the Mali series of graphics processing units by produced by ARM Holdings.
 Utgard, a 2020 album by Enslaved